

All-Time Series
This is a list of the all-time series record for the Chicago Bears against all current NFL franchises in competitive play and how they fared against defunct franchises. That includes all regular season and postseason matchups between the years of 1920 and the 2021 season.

Primetime Football

Sunday Night Football

Monday Night Football

Thursday Night Football

Holiday Football

Thanksgiving Day

***– Overtime game

Christmas Day

References

Chicago Bears
NFL